Paraisurus is an extinct genus of mackerel sharks that lived during the Cretaceous. It contains four valid species, which have been found in Europe, Asia, North America, and Australia. A fifth species, P. amudarjensis, is now considered a synonym of P. compressus. While this genus is mostly known from isolated teeth, an associated dentition of P. compressus was found in the Weno Formation of Texas. It went extinct around the Albian-Cenomanian boundary, as a supposed Coniacian occurrence of "P. sp." is likely a misidentified pseudoscapanorhynchid.

References

Lamniformes
Early Cretaceous Europe
Early Cretaceous North America
Early Cretaceous Asia
Prehistoric shark genera